Wilma Helen Hunley  (September 6, 1920 – October 22, 2010) was a Canadian politician and the 12th Lieutenant Governor of Alberta, the first woman to serve in that post.

Early life
She was born in Acme, Alberta, to James Edgar Hunley and Esta May Hunley.  She first worked as an operator, served overseas in the Army Corps during World War II and eventually owned and operated an International Harvester franchise and an insurance business.

Political career
Hunley served as a town councilor from 1960 to 1966 and then mayor of Rocky Mountain House, Alberta, from 1966 to 1971.  Hunley was elected to the province's legislative assembly as a Progressive Conservative. She was the province's cabinet minister serving as Minister Without Portfolio from 1971 to 1973, Solicitor-General from 1973 to 1975 and then Minister of Social Services and Community Health from 1975 until 1979 when she retired from politics.

In June, 1980, Hunley was appointed chair of the Alberta Mental Health Advisory Council. She also served on the Alberta 75th Anniversary Commission.

Hunley became president of the Progressive Conservative Party of Alberta in 1984 and, in 1985, was appointed by Governor General Jeanne Sauvé, on the advice of Prime Minister Brian Mulroney, to the position of lieutenant-governor. She served in the position until 1991. In 1992, she was made an Officer of the Order of Canada.

Arms

References

Bibliography

External links
Legislative Assembly of Alberta Members Listing

1920 births
2010 deaths
Progressive Conservative Association of Alberta MLAs
Lieutenant Governors of Alberta
Officers of the Order of Canada
Women MLAs in Alberta
Members of the Alberta Order of Excellence
Members of the Executive Council of Alberta
Canadian women viceroys
Women government ministers of Canada